Leopard in the Snow is a 1978 British drama film directed by Gerry O'Hara and starring Keir Dullea, Susan Penhaligon, Kenneth More and Billie Whitelaw. It was based on the 1974  novel Leopard in the Snow by Anne Mather.

Plot summary
In the middle of a blizzard, a young woman takes shelter in a house owned by a former racing driver still recovering from an accident he had some years before.

Cast
 Keir Dullea - Dominic Lyall
 Susan Penhaligon - Helen James
 Kenneth More - Sir Phillip James
 Billie Whitelaw - Isabel James
 Gordon Thomson - Michael Framley
 Jeremy Kemp - Bolt
 Yvonne Masters - Bessie
 Peter Burton - Mr Framley
 Tessa Dahl - Miss Framley

References

External links

1978 films
1978 drama films
British drama films
Films based on British novels
Films directed by Gerry O'Hara
1970s English-language films
1970s British films